Flitwick railway station is in the centre of Flitwick, in Bedfordshire, England. The station is situated on the Midland Main Line.  The station is managed by Thameslink, who operate all trains serving it, and is served by Thameslink route services between Bedford and Brighton.  As well as Flitwick itself, the station also serves the adjoining town of Ampthill, which no longer has its own station.

From Flitwick, trains travel north and serve Bedford and southbound trains serve Luton, Luton Airport Parkway, Harpenden, St Albans, London St Pancras, Gatwick Airport and Brighton.

History
It was built by the Midland Railway in 1870 on its extension to St. Pancras. The original station buildings were restored in the early 1980s.

There were originally platforms for two lines. This remained the case when the line was quadrupled. The up goods opened in 1893 and extended to Harlington in 1894; and the down goods opened in 1895. It was not until 1960 that British Railways added extra platforms to cater for extended stopping services between Bedford and London.

Stationmasters

William Hodgkinson 1870 - 1873
G. Bowles 1873 - 1875
George Croft 1875 - 1884 
Thomas Edward Bowers 1884 - 1886
Simeon Marshall 1886 - 1891
Sheron Morton 1891 - 1894
G.J. Best 1894 - 1898
Frederick Brookes 1898 - 1902 (formerly station master at Southill)
William George Hall 1902 - 1926 (formerly station master at Henlow Camp)
F.J. Newell until 1929  (afterwards station master at Poplar)
Harry Ariss from 1929 (formerly station master of Claydon)

Services

All services at Flitwick are operated by Thameslink using  EMUs.

The typical off-peak service in trains per hour is:
 4 tph to 
 2 tph to 
 2 tph to Three Bridges via 

Facilities
Flitwick station has a waiting room, take away cafe, telephones, toilet and a car park.

The station has the PlusBus scheme where train and bus tickets can be bought together at a saving.  It is in the same area as Harlington station.

There is now only one entrance to the station: through the ticket office from Steppingley Road. The previous second entrance, situated directly onto the footbridge from Dunstable Road, which in 2016 had gates installed, is now permanently closed.

References

External links

Flitwick
Ampthill
Railway stations in Bedfordshire
DfT Category D stations
Former Midland Railway stations
Railway stations in Great Britain opened in 1870
Railway stations served by Govia Thameslink Railway